Juho Lähde (born 11 February 1991) is a Finnish retired footballer.

Career

Club career
On 1 August 2015, he joined VPS on loan from SJK until the end of the season. On 25 November 2015, Lähde then signed a two-year contract with VPS.

On 27 November 2019 TPS confirmed, that Lähde would return to the club on 1 January 2020, signing a deal until the end of 2021. 29-year-old Láhde retired at the end of the year.

References

External links
 

1991 births
Living people
Finnish footballers
Veikkausliiga players
Kakkonen players
Turun Palloseura footballers
Seinäjoen Jalkapallokerho players
Vaasan Palloseura players
Association football midfielders
Footballers from Turku